V. Moorthy is an Indian politician and was a member of the 14th Tamil Nadu Legislative Assembly from Madhavaram constituency.  He represented All India Anna Dravida Munnetra Kazhagam party.

Moorthy was the Minister for Milk and Dairy Development of the Government of Tamil Nadu from November 2011.

The elections of 2016 resulted in his constituency being won by S. Sudharsanam.

Electoral performance

References 

Tamil Nadu MLAs 2011–2016
All India Anna Dravida Munnetra Kazhagam politicians
Living people
State cabinet ministers of Tamil Nadu
Year of birth missing (living people)